The Rose Tattoo is an album by jazz musician Freddie Hubbard recorded in December 1983 and released on the Japanese Baystate label.

Reception
The Allmusic review by Jason Ankeny calls the album "one of Freddie Hubbard's most obscure sessions, but admirers of the trumpeter's early-'80s return to his musical roots will find much to appreciate here".

Track listing
 "When You Wish Upon a Star" (Ned Washington, Leigh Harline) - 6:23
 "Poor Butterfly" (Raymond Hubbell, John Golden) - 6:23
 "My Romance" (Richard Rodgers, Lorenz Hart) - 5:12
 "Embraceable You" (George Gershwin, Ira Gershwin) - 4:28
 "The Rose Tattoo" (Jack Brooks, Harry Warren) - 6:36
 "Time After Time" (Jule Styne, Sammy Cahn) - 6:44
 "My Foolish Heart" (Victor Young, Ned Washington) - 4:47
Recorded December 9 and 10, 1983 at Van Gelder Studio, Englewood Cliffs, New Jersey

Personnel
Freddie Hubbard - trumpet
Ricky Ford - tenor saxophone
Kenny Barron - piano
Cecil McBee - bass
Joe Chambers - drums

References

1983 albums
Freddie Hubbard albums
Albums recorded at Van Gelder Studio
Baystate Records albums